Spring Hill High School is a public high school in Columbia, Tennessee, United States. The school is operated by Maury County Board of Education.

History
Spring Hill High School was opened in the fall of 1933. They moved to their current school building in 1992.

Athletics

Teams
Spring Hill's athletic teams are nicknamed the Raiders and the school's colors are maroon and white. Spring Hill teams compete in the following sports:

Baseball
Bowling
Boys Basketball
Girls Basketball
Cross country
Football
Golf
Rugby
Boys Soccer
Girls Soccer
Softball
Swimming
Tennis
Track
Volleyball
Wrestling

State championships

Football
1986 Tennessee Class A State Champions

Demographics
75% of the student population at Spring Hill High School identify as Caucasian, 14% identify as African American, 8& identify as Hispanic, 2% identify as Asian, 0.3% identify as Hawaiian Native/Pacific Islander, 0.1% identify as American Indian/Alaskan Native, and 0.1% identify as multiracial. The student body makeup is 54% male and 46% female.

References

External links
 

Public high schools in Tennessee
Schools in Maury County, Tennessee
Buildings and structures in Columbia, Tennessee